A finger (sometimes fingerbreadth or finger's breadth) is any of several units of measurement that are approximately the width of an adult human finger, including:

In medicine and related disciplines (anatomy, radiology, etc.) the fingerbreadth (literally the width of a finger) is an informal but widely used unit of measure.

In the measurement of distilled spirits, a finger of whiskey refers to the amount of whiskey that would fill a glass to the level of one finger wrapped around the glass at the bottom.

Another definition (from Noah Webster): "nearly an inch."

Finger is also the name of a longer unit of length used in cloth measurement, specifically, one eighth of a yard or 4 inches.

In English these units have mostly fallen out of use, apart from the common use in distilled drinks and drinking games.

See also
  ('5' in diagram above)
 
  (before 1826)
  (from 1826)

References

Units of length
Human-based units of measurement